Drop da Bomb is a collective of electronic music producers and DJs based in Basel, Switzerland. The Project started in 1997, founder members are: Re?mo (producer / DJ), Rewind (DJ), Rod (graphic designer / DJ) and Stu (chiptune composer on the Atari ST / producer / DJ).

In 1998, Drop da Bomb released their first record "Yakuza EP". It contains 4 musical pieces produced by Re?mo and Stu and can be described as a rather experimental and premature release. The music included was produced in bedroom studios on 4-track tape recorders. The record also includes a couple of sound effects on each side for DJs to scratch with.

During the years 1998-2001 Drop da Bomb contributed their music to a couple of projects. For instance they made a soundtrack for the movie "Lincoln & 31st" by Damien Caldwell that has been shown on many festivals. Later they got involved into the Micromusic movement, where they also received a lot of musical inspiration from other micro-artists. In the year 2001 they remixed the song "full of sid" by Psilodumputer. The original version, as well as the remixes by Drop da Bomb, Sami and Paza Rahm were released on Swiss record label Domizil.

After their debut performance on a Micromusic festival in 2001, Drop da Bomb started to do more and more live acts around Europe and also organised a lot of parties in their hometown Basel, in order to invite other Artists they met on the way. At the same time Stu started to compose chiptunes with Music-Mon on the Atari ST exclusively leveraging the internal YM2149 soundchip, by which he became famous inside the demoscene and micromusic-community. In 2003 Stu became a member of YM Rockerz, an international  collective of active Atari ST musicians.

In 2005 Drop da Bomb toured Germany the last time in the old formation, with Re?mo and Stu as musicians supported by DJ Rewind and Rods laser show. In the same year they released their first pure chiptune EP "3chnls4bit" on the German label Retinascan. The album title stands for "3 Channels - 4 Bit" and therewith all 7 pieces included were produced on an Atari ST without any accessory.

In 2006, a Norwegian band called Fitts for Fight used two of Stus chiptunes (STereoid and dYManite) without any agreement by him and in order to claim it as their own music. The band performed the music without any adjustment (except singing over it) on many festivals. Moreover, the music was played on Norwegian national radio (NRK Urort) and there was even a videoclip made with the song STereoid that was played on Norwegian MTV.

Discography
Yakuza EP (12" Vinyl) - Drop Da Bomb (1998)
Full of SID / Microcompo remixes - Domizil (2001)
STream Volume 1 – 60 Minutes of Chip (Digital / Compact Cassette LE) - Drop Da Bomb (2004)
STream Volume 2 – 60 Minutes of Chip (Digital / Compact Cassette LE) - Drop Da Bomb (2004)
3CHNLS4BIT (5" CD) - Retinascan (2005)
STream Volume 3 – 60 Minutes of Chip (Digital / Compact Cassette LE) - Drop Da Bomb (2005)

External links
 Drop da Bomb homepage
 Stu homepage
 Micromusic: Lo-tech music for hi-tech people
 YM Rockerz: Atari ST chiptune label
 Retinascan: The sound of individualism - German Label
 Domizil: Swiss label

Swiss electronic music groups
Chiptune musicians